A Public Disservice Announcement is the second studio album by the band Methods of Mayhem, released on September 21, 2010.
It is the band's only album since their self-titled debut album, which was released in 1999.

Album information
The album, produced by Scott Humphrey, is unique in that it is composed partially of renditions and parts submitted by individuals from around the world based on the demos (stems) of each song that were posted online at thepublicrecord.com. Both the band and Humphrey listened to the recordings, which numbered over 10,000 – choosing the best and most fitting submission ideas to add to the song's final mix.  In speaking about those who submitted their parts to the music, vocalist Tommy Lee said that:
There is a lot of undiscovered talent out there, from kids just getting started, to shirt tuckers who have a 9 to 5 that just rock out in a bar band on the weekends. They don't want to be famous, but those guys are stars.
"Fight Song" was released as the first single and a music video was released for the second single, "Time Bomb".
The song has peaked at number 42 on the US Rock Songs Chart.

Track listing

Personnel
Methods of Mayhem
 Tommy Lee – lead vocals, rhythm guitar, drums
 John "J3" Allen III – lead guitar, co-lead vocals
 Will Hunt – drums
 Scott Humphrey – synthesizer, piano, backing vocals
 DJ Aero – turntables

Additional musicians

 Phil X – guitar
 Chris Chaney- bass
 Deryck Whibley – guitar
 Chad Kroeger – backing vocals
 Skrillex – synthesizer
 Chino Moreno – vocals
 James Kottak – vocals
 deadmau5 – electronics
 Sofia Toufa – vocals
 Marcus Davis – vocals
 Peter Černohorský – guitar
 John "Johnny Blackout" Hemphill - guitar
 Troy Castellano – additional guitars
 Steven McSwain – backing vocals
 Brett Morrow aka Max Watts – additional guitars
 Pierre Cramez (Cross) – backing vocals/additional guitars/electronics
 Amdukias  – synthesizer
 Kevin Slack – additional guitars/synthesizers
 Josh "JT" Thompson – Additional Guitar
 Kai Korteila – Additional Guitar
 Joshua Walsh – Drums/Samples/Keyboards
 Duffy King - Additional Guitars

Production

 Scott Humphrey – Composer, producer
 Ted Jensen- Mastering
 James Kottak – Composer
 Tommy Lee –  Composer, producer
 Frank Gryner –  Engineer
 Tommy Henriksen – Composer
 Corey Lowery – Composer
 Clint Lowery –  Composer
 Troy McLawhorn – Composer
 Chad Kroeger – Composer
 Chris Baseford – Engineer
 Joel Zimmerman – Composer
 Marcus Davis – Composer
 Karen Stever –   Digital editing
 Sofia Toufa –   Composer
 Phil Xenidis – Composer
 Kai Huppunen – Composer
 John Edward Allen III – Composer
 Athena Kottak – Composer

Charts

References

Methods of Mayhem albums
2010 albums